Flautino may refer to several high-pitched woodwind instruments:

Zuffolo
Sopranino recorder
Piccolo